Manseren Manggoendi or Manseren Manggundi is a mythical hero, originating from the Numfor-Biak region of Papua, Indonesia. Manseren Manggoendi's purpose is to recreate the world. His return will be preceded by the prophet Konor, who will announce his arrival.

References

External links
Papua Heritage Site - Untranslated

Melanesian mythology
Indonesian mythology
Western New Guinea